The Douglas Range is a sharp-crested range, with peaks rising to 3,000 metres, extending 120 km (75 mi) in a northwest–southeast direction from Mount Nicholas to Mount Edred and forming a steep east escarpment of Alexander Island within the British Antarctic Territory, overlooking the north part of George VI Sound.

Geography

History 
Mount Nicholas was seen in 1909 from a distance by the French Antarctic Expedition under Charcot. The full extent of the range was observed by Lincoln Ellsworth on his trans-Antarctic flight of November 23, 1935, and its east escarpment first roughly mapped from air photos taken on that flight by W.L.G. Joerg. The east face of the range was roughly surveyed from George VI Sound by the British Graham Land Expedition (BGLE) in 1936 and resurveyed by the Falkland Islands Dependencies Survey (FIDS) in 1948–50. The entire range, including the west slopes, was mapped in detail from air photos taken by the Ronne Antarctic Research Expedition (RARE), 1947–48, by Searle of the FIDS in 1960.

The Douglas Range was named by the BGLE, 1934–37, for V. Admiral Sir Percy Douglas, chairman of the BGLE Advisory Committee, member of the Discovery Committee from 1928 until his death in 1939, formerly hydrographer of the Royal Navy.

Further reading 
 United States. Defense Mapping Agency. Hydrographic Center, Sailing Directions for Antarctica: Includes Islands South of Latitude 60.̊, P 206
 William Robertson Latady, REPORT ON THE AERIAL PHOTOGRAPHY OF THE RONNE ANTARCTIC RESEARCH EXPEDITION, P 216
 V. Noel, M. Pitts, Gravity wave events from mesoscale simulations, compared to polar stratospheric clouds observed from spaceborne lidar over the Antarctic Peninsula, Journal of Geophysical Research: Atmospheres, American Geophysical Union, 2012, 117 (D11), pp. 20. ff10.1029/2011JD017318ff. ffhal01083648f
 S. R. A. KELLY, P. A. DOUBLEDAY, C. H. C. BRUNTON, J. M. DICKINS, G. D. SEVASTOPULO & P. D. TAYLOR, First Carboniferous and ?Permian marine macrofaunas from Antarctica and their tectonic implications, Journal of the Geological Society, London, Vol. 158, 2001, pp. 219–232.

External links 

 Douglas Range on USGS website
 Douglas Range on AADC website
 Douglas Range on SCAR website
 Douglas Range updated weather forecast
 Douglas Range area map
 Douglas Range on peakery website

References 

Mountain ranges of Alexander Island